Nurceren Akgün (born 20 June 1992) is a Turkish women's handballer, who plays in the Turkish Women's Handball Super League for Kastamonu, and the Turkey national team. The -tall sportswoman plays in the line player position.

References 

1992 births
Sportspeople from Antalya
Turkish female handball players
Muratpaşa Bld. SK (women's handball) players
Turkey women's national handball players
Living people
Mediterranean Games competitors for Turkey
Competitors at the 2018 Mediterranean Games
Competitors at the 2022 Mediterranean Games
21st-century Turkish sportswomen